David Sells Hurwood (1924 – 22 May 2005) was a British general practitioner in Syston and founder member of the Royal College of General Practitioners. In 1945, while studying medicine at Guy's Hospital, he assisted at Bergen-Belsen concentration camp as a voluntary medical student. Here, he developed tuberculosis.

Selected publications
"Out-of-hours calls in a Leicestershire practice". British Medical Journal, Vol. 1, No. 6025 (26 June 2006), pp. 1582–1584.

References 

20th-century British medical doctors
London medical students who assisted at Belsen
1945 in medicine
1924 births
2005 deaths